Budimír is a village and municipality in Košice-okolie District in the Kosice Region of eastern Slovakia.

History
Historically, the village was first mentioned in 1289.

Geography
The village lies at an altitude of 350 metres and covers an area of 4.502 km².
It has a population of about 1 084 people.

Genealogical resources

The records for genealogical research are available at the state archive "Statny Archiv in Kosice, Slovakia"

 Roman Catholic church records (births/marriages/deaths): 1747-1896 (parish A)
 Greek Catholic church records (births/marriages/deaths): 1819-1898 (parish B)
 Lutheran church records (births/marriages/deaths): 1787-1895 (parish B)

See also
 List of municipalities and towns in Slovakia

References

External links
Surnames of living people in Budimir

Villages and municipalities in Košice-okolie District
Šariš